Liu Haitao (born March 18, 1983, in Suixian, Henan) is a Chinese sprint canoer. He has competed since the mid-2000s. Participating in two Summer Olympics, he earned his best finish of seventh in the K-4 1000 m event at Beijing in 2008.

References

Sports-Reference.com profile

1983 births
Living people
People from Shangqiu
Sportspeople from Henan
Olympic canoeists of China
Canoeists at the 2004 Summer Olympics
Canoeists at the 2008 Summer Olympics
Asian Games medalists in canoeing
Canoeists at the 2002 Asian Games
Canoeists at the 2006 Asian Games
Chinese male canoeists
Medalists at the 2002 Asian Games
Medalists at the 2006 Asian Games
Asian Games gold medalists for China
Asian Games silver medalists for China